Marion Rushing (September 3, 1936 – April 26, 2013) was a professional American football player. Born in Pinckneyville, Illinois, he played  seasons in the National Football League (NFL), mainly for the Chicago/St. Louis Cardinals.  He finished his pro rootball career in 1968 with the Houston Oilers of the American Football League (AFL).  While at Southern Illinois University (SIU), Rushing earned more athletic letters than any other athlete in Saluki history. He earned a total of 13 letters while playing football, basketball, track, and wrestling for SIU. Following his career at SIU, Rushing went on to play professional football in both the NFL and AFL. He was inducted into the charter class of the Saluki Hall of Fame in 1978.  In 2010 Southern Illinois University honored Saluki Hall of Famer Marion Rushing by renaming a street near the new football stadium, Marion Rushing Lane.

See also
 List of American Football League players

References

External links
 Profile at NFL.com

1936 births
2013 deaths
American football linebackers
Atlanta Falcons players
Chicago Cardinals players
Houston Oilers players
Southern Illinois Salukis football players
Southern Illinois Salukis men's basketball players
St. Louis Cardinals (football) players
College men's track and field athletes in the United States
Southern Illinois Salukis wrestlers
People from Pinckneyville, Illinois
Players of American football from Illinois
American Football League players
American men's basketball players